The Lee–Kesler method 

allows the estimation of the saturated vapor pressure at a given temperature for all components for which the critical pressure Pc, the critical temperature Tc, and the acentric factor ω are known.

Equations 

with

Typical errors 
The prediction error can be up to 10% for polar components and small pressures and the calculated pressure is typically too low. For pressures above 1 bar, that means, above the normal boiling point, the typical errors are below 2%.

Example calculation 
For benzene with
 Tc = 562.12 K
 Pc = 4898 kPa
 Tb = 353.15 K
 ω = 0.2120

the following calculation for T=Tb results:

 Tr = 353.15 / 562.12 = 0.628247
 f(0) = -3.167428
 f(1) = -3.429560
 Pr = exp( f(0) + ω f(1) ) = 0.020354
 P = Pr * Pc = 99.69 kPa

The correct result would be P = 101.325 kPa, the normal (atmospheric) pressure. The deviation is -1.63 kPa or -1.61 %.

It is important to use the same absolute units for T and Tc as well as for P and Pc. The unit system used (K or R for T) is irrelevant because of the usage of the reduced values Tr and Pr.

References 

Thermodynamic models

See also
Vapour pressure of water
Antoine equation
Tetens equation
Arden Buck equation
Goff–Gratch equation